Ereboglobus is a genus of bacteria from the family of Opitutaceae with one known species Ereboglobus luteus. Ereboglobus luteus has been isolated from guts of cockroach species.

References

Verrucomicrobiota
Bacteria genera
Monotypic bacteria genera
Taxa described in 2018